Clement Stachowiak (May 3, 1902 –  December 12, 1981) was a member of the Wisconsin State Assembly from 1939 to 1940. He was elected to the Assembly on the Wisconsin Progressive Party ticket. In 1948, Stachowiak was an unsuccessful candidate for the United States House of Representatives from Wisconsin's 4th congressional district. Born in Milwaukee, Wisconsin, he was a member of the Socialist Party of America. Stachowiak was a laborer, police officer, and a machinist's helper.

References

Politicians from Milwaukee
Members of the Wisconsin State Assembly
Wisconsin Progressives (1924)
Socialist Party of America politicians from Wisconsin
1902 births
1981 deaths
American politicians of Polish descent
20th-century American politicians
American police officers